Twisted Tales was a horror comics anthology published by Pacific Comics and, later, Eclipse Comics, in the early 1980s. The title was  edited by Bruce Jones and April Campbell.

Publication history
Twisted Tales was published on a bi-monthly schedule by Pacific Comics from November 1982 to May 1984 (eight issues).  After Pacific went bankrupt, two final issues were published by Eclipse Comics in November and December 1984. In August 1986, Blackthorne Publishing released Twisted Tales 3-D #1 (#7 in their 3-D series), with reprints of stories taken from earlier issues.  In November 1987 a Twisted Tales trade paperback was released by Eclipse Comics with a Dave Stevens cover, featuring previously unpublished stories and art.

With three exceptions (William F. Nolan's "The Party" in Issue # 8, Dennis Etchison's "Wet Season" in Issue #9, and David Carren's "If She Dies" in issue #10, which was later adapted into an episode of the 1980s revival of The Twilight Zone), all of the stories in the entire run of Twisted Tales were written by Jones, who had already worked as scripter for Warren Publishings Creepy and Eerie titles.  As noted in his editorial in Issue #1, his chief inspiration was the bloody and ironically moralistic tales of the EC horror comics.  His work in Twisted Tales, often utilizing twist endings, added huge dollops of graphic violence and sexuality to the EC formula, complete with copious female nudity. Several issues sported a "Recommended For Mature Readers" warning on the cover.

Front covers for the comic were by, among others, Richard Corben, John Bolton, and Bernie Wrightson.  Interior artists included Corben, Bolton, Wrightson, Mike Ploog, Val Mayerik, Bill Wray, Tim Conrad, Alfredo Alcala, and Rick Geary, as well as one story written and illustrated by Jones himself.

In 1985, soon after the cancellation of Twisted Tales, Eclipse began publishing The Twisted Tales of Bruce Jones, featuring science fiction, fantasy and horror stories written and illustrated by Jones.  Although the cover of the initial issue noted that it was to be "Part 1 of 2", the title was expanded to a four-issue run and ceased publication in 1986.

In January 2005, Todd McFarlane announced that he was set to produce a half-hour anthology television series for Fox called Twisted Tales, based on the comic book to which McFarlane had purchased the rights. However, according to Bruce Jones, Twisted Tales was a creator-owned property and does not belong to McFarlane.

Issue guide

References

External links
 Fan site re: Twisted Tales

Pacific Comics titles
Defunct American comics
Eclipse Comics titles
Horror comics
1982 comics debuts